The 1962–63 Athenian League season was the 40th in the history of Athenian League. The league consisted of 16 teams. 4 teams promoted to Isthmian League and 12 teams joined the new Premier Division.

League table

References

1962–63 in English football leagues
Athenian League